Gianfranco Chiarini (born January 8, 1966) is an Italian celebrity chef, food engineer, television personality and restaurateur. His career ranges from Michelin starred restaurants, cruise lines, deluxe hotels and resorts, restaurateur, consultancy chef, TV chef, chef to presidents and royalty, research and development chef for the mass manufacturing food companies across Europe, Middle East and Africa, food technology applications chef, culinary teacher and book writer. In addition, Chiarini speaks seven languages: English, Italian, Spanish, French, Portuguese, German and Arabic. These varieties of languages have made him an intercultural chef, permitting him to cross over to many countries and culinary styles internationally.

Early life 
Gianfranco Chiarini was born in Ferrara, Italy, and raised in a multicultural environment with Italian-Colombian origins, growing up between Italy, Venezuela and the United States.

Personal life 
On September 7, 2010 Chiarini married Anna Kinga Chiarini, a nutritionist chef and Italian literature graduate, born in Słupsk, Poland. The couple share a partnership in a culinary consultancy company Chiarini Culinary Consultants that has opened more than 200 restaurants in over 100 countries. They live currently in their 2 acres farm in Bulgaria which is concurrently the site of their newest gourmet sustainable and boutique restaurant named Dieci

Music career 
Chiarini played music on his earlier years, first as a rock singer in pubs and nightclubs opening for American rock bands. When Chiarini grew weary of his rock music career he became a singer with the award winning latin-pop music band Barranco Mix. This band was widely known across the Spanish, and English speaking countries in the Americas and Europe. The band played in the Johnny Canales show in Corpus Christi, Texas with the legendary queen of tejano, Selena and contemporary rock band Maná. Barranco also became the opening band at the Feria de Cali in Colombia where many celebrities from the Salsa music world performed. In 1994 the band won three Ronda Awards and were nominated for the Latin Grammy Awards. The band also was awarded Double Platinum recognition for exceeding a million sales in the United States, Colombia, Mexico and Venezuela. The band has had recording contracts with Polygram Latino in the United States and North America, Sonolux in Colombia, Sonografica in Venezuela. Chiarini performed as one of the lead vocalists of the band from 1993 – 1996. He then retired from his music career and returned to pursuing his career as a chef.

Early cooking career 
In 1986, the young Chiarini enrolled in the Instituto de Alta Gastronomia de Caracas, Venezuela, which has been closed due to political unbalances in the country. In 1996, he decided to go back to the United States where he enrolled at the Pittsburgh Culinary Institute a branch of the world renowned, Le Cordon Bleu. After graduation, he moved to France where he enroll at Le Cordon Bleu Paris one of the most ambitious and prestigious culinary schools in Europe. Chiarini worked under masters like Alain Dutournier chef/owner of Carré des Feuillants (*** Michelin stars), and later while in Rome, Italy working under the enigmatic Executive Chef Heinz Beck at La Pergola Restaurant (***Michelin stars), and in Ferrara, Italy working for top-level restaurants such as, Antichi Sapori and Hostaria Savonarola as a sous chef. Moving became again imminent, when The Pirsch Mühle (* Michelin star), restaurant in Germany offered him the opportunity to run the kitchen along with the Executive Chef and owner, S. Leypold. In early 2000’s Chiarini decided to move to the Middle East, starting with Intercontinental hotels, Al Bustan Palace and Shangri-La Hotels. Later he moved to Bahrain, and developed culinary concepts for Mövenpick and Marriott hotels. His next target was Kuwait, where he fully engaged his culinary career as chef with Marriott Hotels. In Kuwait Chiarini developed a close relationship with the late Highness Sheikh Jaber Al-Ahmad Al-Jaber Al-Sabah, where he created exotic dinners for the family. There he became widely known as a celebrity TV chef, with the broadcasting channel “Al Rai TV”. Chiarini starred in more than 50 cooking shows. Chiarini continues his culinary journey in Africa with the Starwood hotels chain, in one of the most luxurious and posh properties in Eastern Africa; the Sheraton Addis, part of the Luxury Collection of Starwood hotels. Ethiopia is well known for being the diplomatic capital of Africa. Here Chiarini served personalities like; the 39th President of the United States of America, Jimmy Carter and first lady Rosalynn Carter the president of Israel Shimon Peres, the Presidents of the (AU) African Union, including Muammar al- Qaddaf, and Egyptian President Hosni Mubarak. His time spent in Asia has inspired him to travel throughout the continent immersing him in the food, and absorbing the culture giving him a great appreciation and deep understanding of the Asian culture. Countries like China, South Korea, Cambodia, Vietnam, Thailand, Malaysia, Singapore, Japan and the Philippines.

Books and publications 
Chiarini’s, The New Renaissance of Italian Fusion Cuisine Trilogy, contains recipes that fuses Italian culinary with all the continents of the world. Later on in 2015 Chiarini published The Golden Collection of this trilogy and a book dedicated to his native Ferrara entitled, Ferrara Il Gioiello Culinario Nascosto (Ferrara the hidden culinary jewel). Finally in 2020 Chiarini published Ancient Techniques - Modern Looks, a book dedicated to the most ancient cooking techniques plated with avant garde looks. Chiarini has published a total of 6 books to date.

Bibliography 
 The New Renaissance of Italian Fusion Cuisine 1.0:
 The New Renaissance of Italian Fusion Cuisine 2.0:
 The New Renaissance of Italian Fusion Cuisine 3.0:
 The New Renaissance of Italian Fusion Cuisine - The Golden Collection:
 Ferrara Il Gioiello Culinario Nascosto:
 Ancient Techniques | Modern Looks:

Dieci Boutique Restaurant 
Dieci Boutique Restaurant is Chiarini's latest creation, in partnership with Jimmy Beasley. Opened in 2021, Dieci is located on a 2 acre farm in the countryside of Bulgaria, and serves only 10 guests per night for a seasonal 10 course tasting menu.

References 

1966 births
Living people
Italian chefs
Italian television personalities
Alumni of Le Cordon Bleu